HMAS Yarra (F07/DE 45), named for the Yarra River, was a  of the Royal Australian Navy (RAN). The antisubmarine warship operated from 1961 to 1985.

Construction
Yarra was laid down by the Williamstown Naval Dockyard at Melbourne, Victoria on 9 April 1957. An enhanced derivative of the Royal Navy's Type 12 frigate, Yarra was one of four ships constructed to provide an anti-submarine warfare capability for the RAN. She was launched on 30 September 1958 by Lady McBride, wife of the Minister for Defence, and commissioned into the RAN on 27 July 1961.

Operational history
Yarra operated during the Indonesia-Malaysia Confrontation; during a three-week patrol in June 1965, the ship fired on an Indonesian incursion force near Sabah. The ship's service was later recognised with the battle honour "Malaysia 1964–66".

Decommissioning and fate
Yarra paid off 22 November 1985. She was sold for scrap.

Citations

References
 
 
 
 

River-class destroyer escorts
1958 ships